Tunkinsky District (Tünkhenei aimag) is an administrative and municipal district (raion), one of the twenty-one in the Republic of Buryatia, Russia. It is located in the west of the republic. Its administrative center is the rural locality (a selo) of Kyren. As of the 2010 Census, the total population of the district was 22,672, with the population of Kyren accounting for 23.8% of that number.

Administrative and municipal status
Within the framework of administrative divisions, Tunkinsky District is one of the twenty-one in the Republic of Buryatia. The district is divided into five selsoviets and seven somons, which comprise thirty-five rural localities. As a municipal division, the district is incorporated as Tunkinsky Municipal District. Its five selsoviets and seven somons are incorporated as fourteen rural settlements within the municipal district. The selo of Kyren serves as the administrative center of both the administrative and municipal district.

References

Notes

Sources

Districts of Buryatia
 
